There are several rivers named São Domingos River in Brazil:

 São Domingos River (Goiás)
 São Domingos River (Mato Grosso do Sul)
 São Domingos River (Minas Gerais)
 São Domingos River (Rio de Janeiro)
 São Domingos River (Rio Grande do Sul)
 São Domingos River (Rondônia)
 São Domingos River (Santa Catarina)
 São Domingos River (São Paulo)
 São Domingos River (Tocantins)
 São Domingos Grande River

See also
 São Domingos (disambiguation)